Sarah Oppenheimer (born 1972, in Austin, Texas)  is a New York City-based artist whose projects explore the articulations and experience of built space. Her work involves precise transformations of architecture that disrupt, subvert or shuffle visitors' visual and bodily experience. Artforum critic Jeffrey Kastner wrote that Oppenheimer's artworks "typically induce a certain kind of vaguely vertiginous, almost giddy uncertainty" that over time turns "indeterminacies of apprehension into epistemological uncertainties, epistemic puzzlement into ontological perplexity."

Oppenheimer's work has been exhibited internationally at venues including Mudam (Luxembourg), Wexner Center for the Arts, Mass MoCA, Kunstmuseum Thun (Switzerland), and Baltimore Museum of Art. She has received a Guggenheim Fellowship, the Rome Prize, and awards from the Joan Mitchell, Louis Comfort Tiffany and Anonymous Was A Woman foundations, among others.

Work and critical reception
Oppenheimer modifies areas of transition such as thresholds, hallways, windows and doors in order to reveal and reshape spatial hierarchies of observation and influence. Critics distinguish her work by its exploration of the performative possibilities of architecture. Each project acts as a medium of experiential exchange, leading visitors to reconsider perceptions of orientation, structure and the stability of built space. Writers relate Oppenheimer's strategies to those of environmental psychology, situationist psychogeography, and to the work of artists such as Lygia Clark, Robert Irwin, Hans Haacke and Andrea Fraser.

Nomenclature
The titles of Oppenheimer’s works are generated from a numerical typology. Each digit in a title tracks transactions and flow between spatial zones, and together, form a key to the orientation of the work within the built environment. Writer Alexander Galloway likens Oppenheimer’s typology to bitwise operations commonly used in computer architecture and binary arithmetic.

Projects
In early exhibitions at The Drawing Center (2002) and Queens Museum (2004), Oppenheimer explored the interdependence of spatial navigation and interior architecture. Mutable wall panels were reconfigured in the museum space while navigational research was conducted on test subjects monitored under controlled conditions (e.g., Hallway, 2002). In the latter 2000s, Oppenheimer reconfigured the boundaries between exhibition spaces, installing apertures that displaced views within and outside galleries (e.g., Saint Louis Art Museum, 2008; Museum of Contemporary Art San Diego, 2009). 610-3356 (Mattress Factory, 2008) employed a roughly seven-foot-long hole in museum's fourth floor which tunneled down and out a third-floor window to enable a view outside the building.

In D-33 (P.P.O.W., 2012) and 33-D (Kunsthaus Baselland, 2014), Oppenheimer modified the boundary between three contiguous rooms, inserting a pair of slanting openings at the spaces' corners. The openings united, separated and altered the interconnected environments, offering shifting views and light conditions. Edged with bands of dark, matte aluminum cladding, they recalled the drawn lines and shapes of hard-edge geometric abstraction. The New York Times'''s Roberta Smith described D-33 as "a new variation on the empty-gallery-as-art," which combined graphic punch and Caligari-esque Expressionism to torque space "in ways both apparent and mysterious." W-120301 (Baltimore Museum of Art, 2012) was Oppenheimer's first permanent work in a museum. It involved three precise, four-sided cutouts—in the ceiling of a second-floor gallery, in the wall of a third-floor gallery, and in the wall of an adjacent rotunda—that formed a Y-like shape opening into a volume embedded within the floors and walls.Ober, Cara. "Sarah Oppenheimer at the Baltimore Museum of Art," Art Papers, March/April 2013. Retrieved July 14, 2021. She arranged the aperture to create unexpected "shortcut" views of spaces located within a few feet of one another, but experientially remote.

Oppenheimer extended her engagement with passageways and apertures to include movable and manually activated partitions utilizing the concept of the "switch"—devices or junctures that modulate or articulate movement and change, such as open/closed, reflection/transparency, continuity/separation. S-399390 (Mudam, 2016) featured two inhabitable glass passageways that repeatedly changed position in the museum's Grand Hall according to an orchestrated scheme, modifying visitor movement, sightlines and perceptions of the space.

During a two-year residency at the Wexner Center for the Arts, Oppenheimer developed a human-powered apparatus, the biased-axis rotational frame mounting system, for which she received a U.S. patent.Artforum. "Wexner Center Announces Artist Residency Awardees for 2015–16," July 8, 2015. Retrieved July 15, 2021.Oppenheimer, Sarah. "Pivot and Slide," Movement Research Performance Journal, #54: Spatial Practice, 2020, p. 74–5. It was used in three locations: S-281913 (Perez Art Museum Miami, 2016), S-337473 (Wexner Center for the Arts, 2017), and S-334473 (Mass MoCA, 2019).Heinrich, Will. "Don’t Miss These Art Shows and Events This Fall," The New York Times, September 12, 2019. Retrieved July 22, 2021. Each work featured two open glass volumes suspended in midair between thick steel tubes anchored to the floor and ceiling. Viewers set the volumes in slow rotating motion around a diagonal axis. The movement initiated a sequence of unexpected sightlines, thresholds, pathways and choreographies between artwork, viewer and built environment. Laurent Stalder wrote that Oppenheimer's later work "fundamentally challenges the conception of architecture as a solid and durable construction, proposing instead a conception of architecture as a controlled and controllable environment."N-01 (Kunstmuseum Thun, 2020) featured a dynamic exhibition system of mechanically interconnected thresholds which when set in motion changed the position of one another. Describing N-01, Soyoung Yoon wrote, "Each component of the work links to the other, communicates with each other, and the challenge is to see ourselves as also a component within this series of linkages—a complex, apparently-disjunctive series, which we learn to see as a whole."

Awards and collections
Oppenheimer has been awarded fellowships from the John S. Guggenheim Foundation (2007), American Academy in Rome (2010–1), and New York Foundation for the Arts (2016, 2010, 2006).New York Foundation for the Arts. "Names You Know," Alumni. Retrieved July 14, 2021. She has also received awards from Anonymous was a Woman (2013), the Joan Mitchell Foundation (2011), Louis Comfort Tiffany Foundation (2009), and American Academy of Arts and Letters (2007), among others. Her work belongs to the public art collections of Mudam, Perez Art Museum Miami, Museum of Contemporary Art San Diego, Mattress Factory, Baltimore Museum of Art, and Brown University.

 External links 
 Artist's website
Sarah Oppenheimer interview with Alexander Galloway in BOMB'', Fall 2016
Sarah Oppenheimer interview, Clocktower, June 2011

References 

21st-century American artists
American women sculptors
American installation artists
Artists from New York City
Yale University alumni
Brown University alumni
People from Austin, Texas
Living people
1972 births
21st-century American women artists